The Ministry of Transport, Communications and Information Technology is the governmental body in the Sultanate of Oman responsible for all matters relating to infrastructure, including airports and ports, transport, logistics, communications, and information technology. The Ministry was established 15th October 2019 assuming responsibilities from a defunct government body Information Technology Authority.

The Ministry is also responsible for introducing and executing E-Government strategy in the Sultanate of Oman.

Directorates and other centers within The Ministry of Transport, Communications and Information Technology:

 The Directorate General of Policies & Governance
 The Directorate General of Infrastructure and Digital Platforms
 The Directorate General of Sector stimulation and Future skills
 The Directorate General of Digital transformation and Sectors empowerment
 The National Center for Space and Advance Technology
 AI and Oman CERT

References

External links 
 

Government of Oman